The following is a list of events affecting American television in 2015. Events listed include television show debuts, finales, and cancellations; channel launches, closures, and rebrandings; stations changing or adding their network affiliations; and information about controversies and carriage disputes.

Events

January

February

March

April

May

June

July

August

September

October

November

December

Television programs

Debuts

Miniseries

Television films and specials

Returning this year
The following shows will return with new episodes after being canceled or ended their run previously:

Network changes

The following shows aired new episodes on a different network than previous first-run episodes.

Milestone episodes

Ending this year

Entering syndication this year
A list of programs (current or canceled) that have accumulated enough episodes (between 65 and 100) or seasons (3 or more) to be eligible for off-network syndication and/or basic cable runs.

Television stations

Launches

Network affiliation changes
The following is a list of television stations that have made noteworthy network affiliation changes in 2015.

Closures

Deaths

See also
 2015 in the United States
 List of American films of 2015

References

External links 
List of 2015 American television series at IMDb